Conservative Party of Virginia may refer to:

 Conservative Party of Virginia (1867) 
 Conservative Party of Virginia (1965)